M. domestica may refer to:
 Malus domestica, the apple tree, a plant species
 Monodelphis domestica, the gray short-tailed opossum, a mammal species
 Musca domestica, the housefly, a fly species

See also
 Domestica (disambiguation)